"Fire" is a song by R&B/funk band Ohio Players. The song was the opening track from the album of the same name and hit No. 1 on both the Billboard Hot 100 and the Hot Soul Singles chart in early 1975. It spent two weeks atop the soul chart. "Fire" was the Ohio Players' only entry on the new disco/dance chart, where it peaked at No. 10. The song is considered to be the band's signature song along with "Love Rollercoaster".

Background
The song was recorded at Mercury Records' Chicago-based studio.  While performing it in California, the band let Stevie Wonder hear the basic track for the song and he predicted that it would become a big hit. The song is noted for its sound of a siren recorded from a fire truck, heard at the beginning, as well as in the instrumental break in the middle. The edited version avoided much of the repetition of the music.  The composer of Wild Cherry's hit song "Play That Funky Music" has indicated that "Fire" was the inspiration.

Chart positions

Cover versions
A cover of the song was released by Canadian new wave band Platinum Blonde on their third album Contact in 1987. 
Also in 1987, Jamaican reggae duo Sly and Robbie covered the song for their album Rhythm Killers. It was released as a single and peaked at No. 60 on the UK Singles Chart.
Funk band Zapp recorded a cover on their 1989 album Zapp V. 
Industrial hip hop outfit Tackhead covered the song for their 2014 album For the Love of Money.

In popular culture
It was used as the theme song to the Fox reality series Hell's Kitchen until Season 18. 
It was also featured in the fifteenth episode of the fourth season of Gotham.
The song appears in the 2004 movie Ladder 49.
It appears in two 2019 TV commercials: one for the Toyota RAV4, and another for Papa John's Pizza.
"Fire" was referenced in the song "Sweet Revenge" by the Japanese pop group Dreams Come True.
The guitar solo break was frequently used as an outro from the Top Ten segment by The CBS Orchestra on Late Show with David Letterman, with the song's ending added during presentation of the Top Ten on Letterman's final show in 2015.

Sampling
It was sampled in Da Lench Mob's "You and Your Heroes" from Guerillas in tha Mist.

References

External links
[ Song review]

1974 singles
1975 singles
1987 singles
Ohio Players songs
Sly and Robbie songs
Billboard Hot 100 number-one singles
Cashbox number-one singles
1974 songs
Mercury Records singles